Diane McNaron (born 1947 in Texas, died February 20, 2022) was an American singer, producer and Cabaret entertainer. She worked as a stage director and cabaret, art song, opera and jazz singer throughout the US and in Europe, Venezuela and Australia.

Career 
McNaron studied Opera Production at Florida State University from which she received a Master of Music degree in 1973, and at Indiana University with Ross Allen, Max Roethlissberger and Hans Busch. As a singer, she coached with Eleanor Steber in New York, Frau Professor Ena Thiessen at the American Institute of Musical Studies in Graz, Austria, Metropolitan Opera soprano Gianna d'Angelo and with the Kurt Weill repertoire coaches Randolph Symonette and Lys Symonette. She served as an Assistant Director for the Opera Barga Festival in Italy, studying stage direction with Gino Becchi in 1977.

She worked as a voice professor and theatrical stage director at several universities and colleges including Northern Arizona University, Northwestern State University of Louisiana and the University of Adelaide. Australia, from 1978 to 1988. On her return to the US, McNaron became a free-lance singer in the fields of Jazz, Cabaret and Art Song, a cabaret producer/director and voice coach. During 1991, she created the Cabaret duo, Masters’ Cabaret, showcasing songs of Lotte Lenya and Marlene Dietrich. In 2000, she released the CD Music in Flight featuring pianist Shari Boruvka and the works of Kurt Weill, Hanns Eisler, Paul Dessau, LaDonna Smith and Ed Robertson, written while the European composers were in flight from war and political oppression. The album was endorsed by Doctors Without Borders (MSF), winners of the 1999 Nobel Peace Prize.

In 2004, McNaron launched the ensemble, The Politically Incorrect Cabaret, a twelve-member troupe of writers, singer/actors, dancers and instrumentalists, presenting topical political satire in a Berlin-style setting. The troupe plays across the Southeast. Her CD Rosas de Pulpa; Rosas de Cal, recorded with the pianist Heather Coltman, pianist Adam Bowles, violinist Karen Bentley Pollick, violist Melanie Richardson Rodgers and cellist Craig Hultgren featuring the compositions of Valdo Sciammarella, was released in 2010.

McNaron was a founding member of the Birmingham Peace Project of which she became Chair in 2009. She produced rallies, fund-raisers and teach-ins for progressive and charitable organizations and resided in Birmingham, Alabama.

Discography
Music In Flight with Shari Boruvka, Laurie Middaugh, Judith Donaldson, LaDonna Smith and the Indian Springs School Women’s Chorale, 2000
Rosas de Pulpa, Rosas de Cal – the Music of Valdo Sciammarella, with Heather Coltman, Adam Bowles, Karen Bentley Pollick, Melanie Richardson Rodgers and Craig Hultgren, 2010

References

External links
Diane McNaron website at the Internet Archive Wayback Machine 
The Politically Incorrect Cabaret
Birmingham Peace Project
Rosas de Pulpa, Rosas de Cal CD Radio Interview with Robin Jackson on CD release, 2008
Birmingham Five-Star CD Review, Rosas de Pulpa, 2010
CD Universe - Rosas De Pulpa... Rosas De Cal CD
Allmusic - Diane McNaron
NPR Interview, with Tanya Ott, 2009
ABC article “Opposing War, What is it Good For?”, coverage of war protest, 2002

1947 births
2022 deaths
People from Birmingham, Alabama
Florida State University alumni
Indiana University alumni
Cabaret singers